James Edward Parco (born October 22, 1968) is a retired United States Air Force lieutenant colonel, professor, entrepreneur and corporate executive. While in the military, he emerged as a leading voice in the religious intolerance crisis, at the United States Air Force Academy in Colorado Springs, Colorado, United States. After leaving military service, he joined the faculty of Colorado College. In 2014, he founded Mesa Organics and Purplebee's, a cannabis company based in Colorado, which was announced as the first acquisition in Colorado history by a publicly traded company under HB 19–1090. Medicine Man Technologies announced the merger in 2019 which was formalized on 4.20.2020 under the DBA Schwazze,
 which has since become the largest regulated cannabis company in Colorado.

Background
Parco was born in Pueblo, Colorado and attended the United States Air Force Academy as a student. He went on to earn his Master of Business Administration from The College of William & Mary and later, his doctorate from the University of Arizona studying under Amnon Rapoport and Nobel Laureate Vernon L. Smith.

He has published widely in the fields of experimental economics, game theory and military culture.

Parco served on the National Security Council at the White House during the Clinton Administration, overseas with the American Embassy in Tel Aviv and spent two tours as a faculty member at his alma mater.

Following retirement from the military, Parco co-founded a vertically integrated adult-use cannabis company in Pueblo, Colorado in 2014 that included a retail chain of dispensaries in southeast Colorado  combined with one of the largest cannabis oil producing companies in the regulated Colorado market using supercritical  technology.

In 2016, Parco successfully ran a political campaign against cannabis prohibitionists, the first in the United States, to keep cannabis legal in Pueblo County, Colorado.

He served as a tenured full professor of economics and business for nine years at Colorado College where he was named Teacher of the Year in 2017. He joined the Schwazze executive team following the merger as head of manufacturing  and later, named president of Schwazze Biosciences.

Social Justice at the US Air Force Academy
After returning from overseas in 2003, Parco resumed his teaching post at the Air Force Academy in Colorado Springs where he began forwarding evidence of systemic evangelical proselytizing to the institution's chain of command. In 2005, following the ousting of Air Force chaplain Melinda Morton, the Air Force investigated the nationally publicized religious intolerance crisis, and released a report identifying a series of problems that led to the issuance of revised religious guidelines. He later co-authored a paper with Barry Fagin in the Humanist  proposing an Oath of Equal Character, and explaining the structural problems that likely led to the observed issues. In 2007, he was awarded the Thomas Jefferson National Award for the Preservation of Religious Freedom, for his efforts by the Military Religious Freedom Foundation. He was subsequently reassigned to the Air Command and Staff College in 2007 where he ended his military career teaching courses in leadership and strategy. He received the Outstanding Faculty Award from the Military Officers Association of America in 2009 and in 2010, he became the first military officer in the history of Air University to be promoted to the academic rank of full professor and later named educator of the year. He retired from active duty in 2011.

Development of the largest cannabis supply chain in the United States
In 2014, Parco and his wife founded Mesa Organics, a vertically integrated adult-use cannabis operation on the property in which is family has resided for five generations. In 2016, Parco successfully ran the "Vote No on 200" campaign  to keep cannabis legal in Pueblo County. By 2018, working in conjunction with local growers, he created one of the largest supply chains for bulk cannabis oil in Colorado. In June 2019, Medicine Man Technologies signed a binding term sheet to acquire the Mesa Organics chain of dispensaries and Purplebee's, a large-scale cannabis extraction plant. Parco announced his retirement from academia to join the executive team of Schwazze (the rebranded d/b/a for Medicine Man Technologies Inc) in April 2020.

Books and publications
Parco has authored several dozen papers and five books to include the 2015 path-breaking essay, "For God and Country", chronicling the growing religious fundamentalism in the US military and the first paper on the effects of pressure with supercritical  extraction of cannabis. He is a co-author of The 52nd Floor, Echoes of Mind and The Line and a co-editor of Attitudes Aren't Free, and The Rise and Fall of DADT.

References

1968 births
Living people
United States Air Force Academy alumni
United States Air Force officers
United States National Security Council staffers
People from Pueblo, Colorado
College of William & Mary alumni
University of Arizona alumni
Colorado College faculty
Economists from Arizona
Economists from Colorado
20th-century American economists
21st-century American economists